Västerås IK (Västerås Ishockey klubb) is a professional ice hockey club from Västerås, Sweden. The team is currently playing in the second-tier league in Sweden, Hockeyallsvenskan. Västerås IK played 12 seasons in the top Swedish league Elitserien (1988–89 to 1999–00) before the club went bankrupt and merged with the junior club (Västerås IK Ungdom), which changed name to VIK Västerås HK in 2005. In 2018, after playing a year in tier three, Hockeyettan, the club changed it name back to the old name Västerås IK.

History

Västerås IK was founded in 1913 and started playing ice hockey in 1939. The ice hockey section of Västerås IK was later separated and was active until 2000, when the club folded and the A team was moved to the club Västerås IK Ungdom (English: junior), which changed to its current name in 2018.

Season-by-season
This list features only the ten most recent seasons.  For a more complete list, see List of VIK Västerås HK seasons.

Famous players
Mikael Backlund
Patrik Berglund
Anders Berglund
Magnus Eriksson
Erik Ersberg
Mishat Fahrutdinov
Mats Ytter
Patrik Juhlin
Nicklas Lidström
Pär Mårts
Peter Popovic
Leif Rohlin
Tommy Salo
Göran "Flygis" Sjöberg
Aleksei Salomatin
Rickard Wallin
Uno Öhrlund
Fredrik Johansson

References

External links

Official homepage

Ice hockey teams in Sweden
Sport in Västerås
Ice hockey teams in Västmanland County
HockeyAllsvenskan teams